Aicart is a given name and a surname with both Spanish and French origin. Notable people with the name include:

 Aicart or Aycart del Fossat, Occitan troubadour
 José Manuel Pérez-Aicart (b 1982), Spanish auto racing driver.
 Pepe Aicart (b 1986), Spanish footballer

Spanish-language surnames
French-language surnames
Surnames of Spanish origin
Surnames of French origin